The Aorangi skink (Oligosoma roimata) is a species of lizards in the skink family. The species is native to New Zealand.

Distribution
In New Zealand O. roimata is endemic to the Poor Knights Islands, off the east coast of the Northland region. It is known to be present on the island of Aorangi.

Related species
Closely related species also present on Aorangi Island include Oligosoma hardyi.

Relationships
O. roimata is most closely related to Oligosoma ornatum, which is a variable species complex. Although morphological divergence is very minor, there is 8.7–9.8% sequence divergence (using the ND2 mitochondrial gene). O. roimata has been previously referred to informally as Cyclodina ornata "Poor Knights", Cyclodina ornata "PKI", and Oligosoma ornatum "Poor Knights Islands".

Diagnosis
From Oligosoma ornatum, the species can be recognised by its white venter. The venter of O. ornatum is usually flushed with variable colour, but may sometimes be white or cream. The ear opening
is slightly smaller than that of O. ornatum.

References

Oligosoma
Reptiles described in 2013
Reptiles of New Zealand
Terrestrial biota of New Zealand
Taxa named by Geoff B. Patterson
Taxa named by Rod A. Hitchmough
Taxa named by David G. Chapple